Worst Roommate Ever is a 2022 Netflix docuseries which features four stories about roommates with malevolent and sometimes violent intentions who turn the lives of their unsuspecting victims into real-life nightmares.

Cases 

 Dorothea Puente
 K.C. Joy
 Youssef Khater  (or Josef Maria)
 Jamison Bachman (or Jed Creek)

Cast 
 John Cabrera

Episodes

See also 
 Communal apartment

References

External links
 
 .

2022 American television series debuts
2020s American black television series
2020s American documentary television series
English-language Netflix original programming
Documentary television series about crime in the United States